2004 Academy Awards may refer to:

 76th Academy Awards, the Academy Awards ceremony that took place on February 29, 2004
 77th Academy Awards, the ceremony held on February 27, 2005 honoring the best in film for 2004